Kirk Franklin and the Family (Live) is the debut album released by Kirk Franklin. This is also the debut album by Franklin in collaboration with his seventeen-voice formed choir, the Family. It was released on June 29, 1993, and it was his first album.

Background information

All songs on the album were written and arranged by Kirk Franklin. "Speak To Me" includes partial adaptation of a Stanley Brown/Hezekiah Walker composition.

Track listing

Charts

Weekly charts

Year-end charts

Certifications

Personnel

Vocalists
David Mann
Elder Jonathan Drummond
Dalon Collins
Byron Cole
Minister Darrell Blair
Tommy Colter
Duawne Starling
Sheila Brice
Ramona White
Nelda Washington
Terri Pace
Carrie Young-Davis "Mousie"
Kesha Grandy
Tamela Mann
Janette Williams
Demetrius "Dee" Hereford
Yolanda McDonald
Teresa Young
Cassandra Cleveland-Robertson

Musicians
Jerome Allen - bass
Eric Morgan - drums
Jerome Harmon, Bobby Sparks - keyboards
Anthony Thomas - bandleader

Awards
The album won a GMA Dove Award for Traditional Gospel Album of the Year at the 24th GMA Dove Awards in 1993.

References

Kirk Franklin albums
1993 live albums